The 2006 Copa Indonesia was the second edition of Piala Indonesia, the nationwide football cup tournament in Indonesia, involving clubs from Premier Division, First Division and Second Division. The winner of the tournament qualified to play for 2007 AFC Champions League.

Arema Malang became champions after a victory over Persipura Jayapura in the final match at Gelora Delta Stadium, Sidoarjo.

First round

Region I 

|}

Region II 

|}

Region III 

|}

Region IV 

|}

Second round 

|}

Third round 

|}

Quarterfinal 

|}

Semifinal 

|}

Final

References

External links
Official site Liga Indonesia

2006
Copa Indonesia
Copa Indonesia
2005–06 in Indonesian football